"Tainted Obligation" is the fourth episode of the sixth season of the American television medical drama Grey's Anatomy, and the show's 106th episode overall. It was written by Jenna Bans and directed by Tom Verica. The episode was originally broadcast on the American Broadcasting Company (ABC) in the United States on October 8, 2009. In the episode, Dr. Meredith Grey (Ellen Pompeo) and Dr. Lexie Grey (Chyler Leigh)'s father is admitted into the hospital, seeking a liver transplantation. Further storylines include Dr. Cristina Yang (Sandra Oh) getting nervous about losing her job, and Dr. Owen Hunt (Kevin McKidd) attempting to perform surgery on a terminal patient with Dr. Izzie Stevens (Katherine Heigl).

Although the episode was fictionally set in Seattle, Washington, filming primarily took place in Los Angeles, California. Jeff Perry reprised his role as a guest star, while Ralph Waite and Jocko Sims made their first appearances. The episode's title refers to the song "Tainted Obligation", by American alternative rock group Community Trolls. "Tainted Obligation" opened to positive critical reviews, with Pompeo's and Chyler Leigh's (Dr. Lexie Grey) performances receiving praise in particular. Upon its initial airing, the episode was viewed by 14.13 million Americans, and garnered a 5.4/14 Nielsen rating/share in the 18–49 demographic, ranking #3 for the night in terms of viewership.

Plot
Dr. Alex Karev (Justin Chambers) leaves his trailer for work, as he approaches a bear growling outside. He wants to move back to Dr. Meredith Grey (Ellen Pompeo)'s house, but Dr. Izzie Stevens (Katherine Heigl) insists that they must go forward in life. Dr. Lexie Grey (Chyler Leigh) brings her father, Thatcher Grey (Jeff Perry), who is vomiting blood, into the emergency room, and Dr. Miranda Bailey (Chandra Wilson) treats him. Dr. Mark Sloan (Eric Dane) admits an elderly patient, Irving Waller (Ralph Waite), with skin growths, who later reveals that he wants a penile implant, to which he receives. It is revealed that Thatcher needs a liver transplantation, and Stevens is assigned to a cancerous patient, Randy (Jocko Sims), by Dr. Owen Hunt (Kevin McKidd). Dr. Callie Torres (Sara Ramirez) wants to ask the chief of surgery Dr. Richard Webber (James Pickens, Jr.) for a job as an attending surgeon, but is nervous that he will reject her, and goes out to lunch with her girlfriend Dr. Arizona Robbins (Jessica Capshaw).

Dr. Cristina Yang (Sandra Oh) is fearful that she will be cut from the hospital's staff, so she tries to get her name on the surgical board. Stevens and Hunt operate on Randy, and it is revealed that he is terminal. Lexie wants to donate her liver to Thatcher, but she is not a viable candidate, so she asks Meredith to do it, who subsequently agrees. Randy and his wife are dismayed with the outcome of the surgery, and Stevens proposes a plan to Hunt on how they can save him. Hunt agrees, but when the surgery suffers complications, the patient is pronounced dead, and Hunt condemns Stevens. Meredith undergoes the surgery, and it is a success for both her and Thatcher. Yang confronts Webber, and tells him that if a cardiothoracic surgeon is not hired, she should be cut from the program. At the conclusion of the episode, Stevens sees the bear, and ultimately agrees that she and Karev need to relocate, out of the forest.

Production

The episode was written by Jenna Bans and directed by Tom Verica. Edward Ornelas edited the episode, and Donald Lee Harris served as production designer. The episode's title refers to the song "Tainted Obligation", by American alternative rock group Community Trolls. Featured music includes The Voluntary Butler Scheme's "Trading Things In" and Dragonette's "Come On Be Good". Pompeo was pregnant during the episode, so the filming crew had to work around it. In the episode, Lexie advocated for Meredith to donate her liver, because she was unable to. Bans commented on this: "It was REALLY easy for me to understand Lexie in this episode – 'cause that's how I imagine she grew up with [her mother] and Thatcher. There was taco night, and movie night, and if she had homework issues, one of them was always around to help. So now that her Dad needs some of her liver, recovering alcoholic or not, she’s gonna do it. She's not even thinking about the Chief's upcoming merger – and the fact that recovering from a major surgery will put her on the bench, out of the game, for at least a month. Lexie doesn't blink, because family isn't an obligation to her like it is for a lot of people -  it's a gift." The scene in which Meredith offers her liver to Thatcher was originally intended to rekindle their relationship. Bans later changed this, following a request from Pompeo, and offered her insight: 

Bans called Waller getting a new penis the most emotional scene she had to write, adding: "I loved this story because I hate the idea that once you're old, your life is over. I hate when people treat their aging parents like old furniture they want to get rid of but have to find a place for so they stick 'em in the corner and forget about them." Bans also commented on Heigl's character's storyline, writing: "Poor Izzie. The girl's living with cancer, lost her best friend, impulsively got married and dragged her husband away to live in the woods. That takes a lot out of a person. I need to seriously recover on the couch for an hour after I go to the grocery store – I can't imagine the emotional and physical fatigue Izzie must be feeling right now. I think by the end of this episode, after Owen tells her that channeling her experience as a patient at Seattle Grace is undermining her strength as a doctor at Seattle Grace – she's wondering if she made a mistake. She's wondering if Alex and Derek and now Owen might be right – that she came back to work too soon. That she's not emotionally ready to be cutting into people yet. Because I think every doctor wants to believe all their terminal patients can be Izzie – but the odds tell another story."

Reception

Broadcasting 
"Tainted Obligation" was originally broadcast on October 8, 2009 in the United States on the American Broadcasting Company. The episode was viewed by a total of 14.13 million Americans, down 1.56% from the previous episode "I Always Feel Like Somebody's Watchin' Me", which garnered 15.69 million viewers. In terms of viewership, "Tainted Obligation" ranked third for the night, just behind CBS's juggernauts CSI and The Mentalist. The episode did not win in viewership, but its 5.4/14 Nielsen rating ranked first in its 9:00 Eastern time-slot and the entire night, for both the rating and share percentages of the key 18–49 demographic, beating out CSI, The Mentalist, Private Practice, and The Office. Although its rating won for the night, it was a decrease from the previous episode, which garnered a 6.1/16 rating/share in the 18–49 demographic.

Critical reception 

The episode was generally well received among television critics. Glenn Diaz of BuddyTV commented that Perry's character was "the man of the hour", in addition to praising Pompeo's performance, writing: "You gotta love Mer when she's gloomy." Diaz also called Yang not having a surgery "hilarious", and praised the chemistry between Ramirez's and Capshaw's characters. PopSugar called the title of the episode appropriate, and also praised Pompeo's performance, adding: "I felt for Meredith, but after Lexie's heartfelt begging and pleading, I was happy that Mere finally grows up and casts her selfishness aside. Three seasons ago Meredith would never have dreamed of putting Lexie first, and I was proud of her for giving up part of her liver—her offer to get to know her dad was an even bigger milestone." PopSugar also enjoyed Oh's performance, commenting that they enjoyed her "vulnerable" side, and writing that overall the episode felt "lackluster". Cinema Blend Amanda Krill found Yang "babyish" and "whiny".

TV Guide Adam Bryant called the scene with the bear "one of the funniest moments on TV that week". Bryant also praised the story arc between Torres and Robbins, adding: "I really like how honest Arizona is with Callie, and the way she puts the firecracker in her place." He was positive of Leigh's performance, writing: "Chyler Leigh gave a powerful performance in this episode. Her speech to Meredith was a little overwritten, but she almost made you forget that with her emotion. And the bond that is growing between Lexie and Meredith is nice to see. From Meredith finally saying out loud how she feels about Lexie, to Lexie being at Mer's side when she wakes up, I am really glad to see these sisters' happy." Michael Pascua of The Huffington Post gave a positive review of the episode, commenting: "I love how Grey's Anatomy can bounce between serious and hysterical moments. Old people wanting penile implants, bears attacking a groggy Alex, counterbalanced with Mercy West drama, Cristina being ignored, and Lexie's father arriving at the hospital hacking blood." Pascua also praised the writing of Waite's character's storyline and Leigh's performance.

References

External links
"Tainted Obligation" at ABC.com

Grey's Anatomy (season 6) episodes
2009 American television episodes